Meerut Assembly constituency is a part of Meerut district, Uttar Pradesh, India. VVPAT facility with EVMs have been here in 2017 U.P. assembly polls.

Members of Legislative Assembly
2012: Dr. Laxmikant Bajpai, Bharatiya Janata Party

Election results

2022

2017

See also
 List of constituencies of the Uttar Pradesh Legislative Assembly
 Meerut district

References

External links
 

Assembly constituencies of Uttar Pradesh
Meerut
Politics of Meerut district